Corinth is an unincorporated community in Williams County, North Dakota, United States.

Notes

Unincorporated communities in Williams County, North Dakota
Unincorporated communities in North Dakota